Gradaterebra planecosta is a species of sea snail, a marine gastropod mollusc in the family Terebridae, the auger snails.

Description

Distribution

References

External links
 Barnard, K. H. (1958). Contributions to the knowledge of South African marine Mollusca. Part I. Gastropoda: Prosobranchiata: Toxoglossa. Annals of the South African Museum. 44(1): 73-163
 Fedosov, A. E.; Malcolm, G.; Terryn, Y.; Gorson, J.; Modica, M. V.; Holford, M.; Puillandre, N. (2020). Phylogenetic classification of the family Terebridae (Neogastropoda: Conoidea). Journal of Molluscan Studies

Terebridae
Gastropods described in 1958